Eriogonum roseum is a species of wild buckwheat known by the common name wand buckwheat. It is native to much of western California and the Sierra Nevada foothills, as well as parts of Oregon, and it is widespread and common in several plant communities.

Description
Eriogonum roseum is an erect annual herb reaching maximum heights of well over half a meter (2 feet).  Small oval leaves are located at the base of the plant and the inflorescence is slender and has few erect branches.

Flower clusters are located at nodes evenly spaced along the wandlike branches. The flowers are white or shades of yellow, pink, or both.

External links
Jepson Manual Treatment - Eriogonum roseum
Eriogonum roseum - UC Photos gallery

roseum
Flora of California
Flora of Oregon
Flora of the Klamath Mountains
Flora of the Sierra Nevada (United States)
Natural history of the California chaparral and woodlands
Natural history of the California Coast Ranges
Natural history of the San Francisco Bay Area
Natural history of the Transverse Ranges
Flora without expected TNC conservation status